Charles Harry Price II (April 1, 1931 – January 12, 2012) was a prominent American businessman and ambassador of the United States.

Early life
Price was born to a prominent family in Kansas City, Missouri which owned a local candy manufacturing firm, the Price Candy Company.  He attended Wentworth Military Academy in Lexington, Missouri, and then the Pembroke-Country Day School in Kansas City, where he graduated in 1948.  He obtained his Bachelor of Arts degree from the University of Missouri in 1953.  After college, between 1953 and 1955, he served in the United States Air Force.

After his discharge from the Air Force, Price returned to Kansas City to begin a prominent career in the local banking industry.  He served as chairman and President of American Bancorporation, Inc., Chairman and CEO of the American Bank and Trust Company, and chairman and President of Linwood Securities Company.  He also ran his family's candy company, serving as chairman and CEO from 1969 to 1981.

Public life
In the spring of 1981, President Ronald Reagan appointed Price to be United States Ambassador to Belgium. He was quickly and unanimously confirmed by the United States Senate. In 1983, President Reagan recalled Price from his post in Belgium and appointed him Ambassador to the United Kingdom. The Senate again confirmed him unanimously, and he held the post until the end of the Reagan Administration in 1989. As Ambassador to the United Kingdom, he was instrumental in handling the aftermath of the bombing of Pan Am Flight 103 in 1988 and was the first U.S. government official on the scene in Lockerbie, Scotland on the night of the bombing. He gave the first indication that it was the worst terrorist attack against the U.S. when he told reporters that 70% of those on board were Americans.

Upon returning from his ambassadorial post in April 1989, Price was appointed chairman of the board of Ameribanc, Inc., and then became President and CEO in 1990. Ameribanc merged with Mercantile Bancorporation in May 1992, and Price became chairman of the board of Mercantile Bank of Kansas City and Mercantile Bank of Kansas. He held this position until retiring in 1996.

Price also served as a Director of British Airways (1989–1996), Hanson plc (1989–1995), US Industries, Inc. (1995–2004), The New York Times Company (1989–2002), Texaco (1989–2001), and Sprint (1989–1995). In Kansas City, he served on numerous philanthropic boards.  He also received numerous awards and honorary degrees for his public service.

Price lived in Indian Wells, California with his wife, Carol Swanson Price, after his retirement. He died on January 12, 2012, in Indian Wells and was buried at Forest Hill Calvary Cemetery in Kansas City, Missouri.

References

External links

1931 births
2012 deaths
Ambassadors of the United States to Belgium
Ambassadors of the United States to the United Kingdom
American bankers
Businesspeople in confectionery
Businesspeople from Kansas City, Missouri
University of Missouri alumni
Wentworth Military Academy and College alumni
United States Air Force airmen
Military personnel from Missouri
People from Indian Wells, California
20th-century American businesspeople
20th-century American philanthropists
20th-century American diplomats